The BIRS Index is a share index of the 12 largest companies listed on the Banja Luka Stock Exchange (BLSE), established on 1 May 2004.  BIRS stands for Berzanski indeks Republike Srpske, which is Serbian for The Stock Exchange Index of Republika Srpska, an entity in Bosnia and Herzegovina. 

The constituents of the index are determined semi-annually, on 15 May and 15 November. Component companies must meet a number of requirements set out by the BLSE. The highest value of the index to 22 September 2006, was on that day, at 2073.24.

Other indices on the Banja Luka Stock Exchange are the FIRS (an index of 13 privatisation-investment funds) and ERS10 (an index of 10 companies from the power utility sector).

As of 30 August 2006, the largest company by market capitalisation was Telekom Srpske a.d. Banja Luka, with the market cap of over BAM 1bn (€538m). All of the companies listed on this index include the abbreviation a.d. (akcionarsko drušvo) at the end of their name, indicating their status of a public limited company.

List of BIRS companies 
The following table lists the 12 BIRS companies according to their market capitalisation on 22 August 2006. At that date BAM1 was equivalent to USD0.66.

Performance

See also 
 Republika Srpska Securities Commission

External links
 Banja Luka Stock Exchange

Economy of Bosnia and Herzegovina
Economy of Republika Srpska
Economy of Banja Luka
European stock market indices